Mary Jo Deschanel (née Weir) is an American actress. She is known for roles in the film The Right Stuff and the television series Twin Peaks.

Life and career
Deschanel was born as Mary Josephine Weir. Her ancestry includes Irish, French, Swiss, Dutch, and English. After small television appearances, Deschanel's first major film role was portraying Annie Glenn, the wife of the astronaut John Glenn (played by Ed Harris), in the 1983 movie adaptation of the 1979 Tom Wolfe book The Right Stuff.

The next year, Deschanel played Betty Fernandez, the remarried former wife of the astronaut Dave Bowman (played by Keir Dullea), in the film 2010. She also played the role of Mrs. Howard in the 2000 film The Patriot.

Deschanel played Eileen Hayward in the TV series Twin Peaks. She has appeared in the TV series House in the episode "Simple Explanation" as Julia Kutner, the adoptive mother of recently deceased Dr. Lawrence Kutner.

Deschanel was featured a second time as the wife of a character played by Ed Harris, in the movie Winter Passing (2005), although she was only seen in a photograph on the wall. Despite never physically appearing in this movie, she did receive full billing in the credits as the character "Mary".

She is married to cinematographer Caleb Deschanel. Her daughters, Emily and Zooey, are also actresses.

Filmography

References

External links

Living people
American film actresses
Actresses from Los Angeles
University of California, Los Angeles alumni
American people of Dutch descent
American people of English descent
American people of French descent
American people of Irish descent
American people of Swiss descent
Year of birth missing (living people)